The S&P/ASX 20 index is a stock market index of stocks listed on the Australian Securities Exchange from Standard & Poor's. While the "ASX 20" often simply refers to the 20 largest companies by market capitalisation, the S&P/ASX 20 Index is calculated by using the S&P Dow Jones Indices market capitalization weighted and float-adjusted methodologies. All 20 companies also feature in the S&P/ASX 50.

Constituent companies 
As of May 2022, the constituent stocks of the ASX 20 in alphabetical order by symbol are:

See also 

 S&P/ASX 50
 S&P/ASX 200
 S&P/ASX 300
 All Ordinaries

References 

Australian Securities Exchange
Australian stock market indices
A020